St. John is a city in St. Louis County, Missouri, United States, with its commercial district centered along St. Charles Rock Road. It is a few miles southeast of Lambert-St. Louis International Airport.

As of the 2020 census, the city population was 6,643.

Geography

Demographics

2020 census
As of 2020, there were 6,643 people living in the city. The racial makeup of the city was 50.9% White (49.2% non-Hispanic White), 31.7% African American, 0.4% Native American, 1.9% Asian, 6.3% from other races, and 8.6% from two or more races. Hispanic or Latino of any race were 10.7% of the population.

2010 census
As of the census of 2010, there were 6,517 people, 2,624 households, and 1,658 families living in the city. The racial makeup of the city was 67.4% White, 24.3% African American, 0.4% Native American, 1.8% Asian, 0.1% Pacific Islander, 2.8% from other races, and 3.3% from two or more races. Hispanic or Latino of any race were 6.8% of the population.

There were 2,624 households, of which 32.1% had children under the age of 18 living with them, 37.8% were married couples living together, 19.1% had a female householder with no husband present, 6.3% had a male householder with no wife present, and 36.8% were non-families. 30.0% of all households were made up of individuals, and 8.8% had someone living alone who was 65 years of age or older. The average household size was 2.45 and the average family size was 3.03.

The median age in the city was 36.3 years. 24.1% of residents were under the age of 18; 8.8% were between the ages of 18 and 24; 28.7% were from 25 to 44; 26.2% were from 45 to 64; and 12.3% were 65 years of age or older. The gender makeup of the city was 48.0% male and 52.0% female.

2000 census
As of the census of 2000, there were 6,871 people, 2,774 households, and 1,767 families living in the city. The racial makeup of the city was 81.79% White, 13.99% African American, 1.27% Asian, 0.23% Native American, 0.77% from other races, and 1.95% from two or more races. Hispanic or Latino of any race were 2.37% of the population.

There were 2,774 households, out of which 30% had children under the age of 18 living with them, 43% were married couples living together, 16% had a female householder with no husband present, and 36.3% were non-families. 29.2% of all households were made up of individuals, and 10.7% had someone living alone who was 65 years of age or older. The average household size was 2.44 and the average family size was 3.03.

In the city, the population was spread out, with 25.2% under the age of 18, 7.8% from 18 to 24, 32.0% from 25 to 44, 19.9% from 45 to 64, and 15.1% who were 65 years of age or older. The median age was 37 years. For every 100 females, there were 91.6 males. For every 100 females age 18 and over, there were 88.2 males.

The median income for a household in the city was $37,754, and the median income for a family was $43,922. Males had a median income of $31,304 versus $25,646 for females. The per capita income for the city was $18,581. About 6.4% of families and 7.8% of the population were below the poverty line, including 9.3% of those under age 18 and 6.2% of those age 65 or over.

References

External links
 City of St. John official website

Cities in St. Louis County, Missouri
Cities in Missouri